Quentin Boisgard (born 17 March 1997) is a French professional footballer who plays as a midfielder for Pau FC, on loan from FC Lorient.

Club career
Boisgard is a youth exponent from Toulouse FC. He made his Ligue 1 debut on 4 November 2017 against Nantes, coming on for Max-Alain Gradel in the 75th minute of a 2–1 away loss.

Boisgard joined FC Lorient in July 2020, after Toulouse's relegation from and Lorient promotion to Ligue 1. He signed a four-year contract while Lorient paid a reported €2 million transfer fee to Toulouse.

On 24 January 2023, he joined Ligue 2 club Pau FC on loan for the remainder of the 2022–23 season.

Career statistics

Club

References

1997 births
Living people
Footballers from Toulouse
Association football midfielders
French footballers
Ligue 1 players
Ligue 2 players
Championnat National players
Toulouse FC players
Pau FC players
FC Lorient players